Montval-sur-Loir is a commune in the Sarthe department in the region of Pays de la Loire in north-western France. The municipality was established on 1 October 2016 and consists of the former communes of Château-du-Loir, Montabon and Vouvray-sur-Loir.

Population

See also
Communes of the Sarthe department

References

Communes of Sarthe
Maine (province)